Standard gauge was favored for railway construction in the United States, although a fairly large narrow-gauge system developed in the Rocky Mountains of Colorado and Utah.  Isolated narrow-gauge lines were built in many areas to minimize construction costs for industrial transport or resort access, and some of these lines offered common carrier service.  Outside Colorado, these isolated lines evolved into regional narrow-gauge systems in Maine, New York, Pennsylvania, Ohio, Iowa, Hawaii, and Alaska.

New England

In New England, the first narrow-gauge common-carrier railroad was the Billerica and Bedford Railroad, which ran from North Billerica to Bedford in Middlesex County, Massachusetts from 1877 to 1878.  There were extensive  gauge lines in the Maine forests early in the 20th century. In addition to hauling timber, agricultural products and slate, the Maine lines also offered passenger services. The Boston, Revere Beach & Lynn Railroad was a narrow-gauge commuter railroad that operated in Massachusetts, much of whose right-of-way is used for rapid transit today. Narrow gauges also operated in the mountains of New Hampshire, on the islands of Nantucket and Martha's Vineyard and in a variety of other locations.  The still-operating Edaville Railroad tourist heritage railroad in southeastern Massachusetts is a two-foot narrow-gauge system.

Mid-Atlantic

The last remaining  gauge common carrier east of the Rocky Mountains was the East Broad Top Railroad in central Pennsylvania. Running from 1873 until 1956, it supplied coal to brick kilns and general freight to the towns it passed through, connecting to the Pennsylvania Railroad at Mount Union, Pennsylvania. Purchased for scrap by the Kovalchick Corporation when it ended common carrier service in 1956, it reopened as a tourist railroad in 1960. This trackage is today the oldest surviving stretch of narrow-gauge railroad in the United States.

It was the last survivor of an extensive narrow-gauge network in New York and Pennsylvania that included many interconnecting lines. The largest concentration was in the Big Level region around Bradford, Pennsylvania, from which lines radiated towards Pittsburgh and into New York state. This group also included the Tonawanda Valley & Cuba Railroad. Though the TV&C's narrow-gauge tracks are long gone, the standard-gauge Arcade & Attica Railroad continues to run over a portion of the TV&C's route. The Waynesburg & Washington Railroad, a subsidiary of the Pennsylvania Railroad, operated in the southwestern part of the state until 1933.

The Philadelphia and Atlantic City Railway and the Pleasantville & Ocean City Railroad were originally built to  gauge.

Southeast
The Southeast helped initiate the narrow-gauge era. The first in Georgia was the Kingsboro & Cataula Railway, chartered in 1870. In Tennessee, the Duck River Valley Narrow Gauge Railway was also chartered in 1870, opening seven years later; it was converted to standard gauge in 1888. The first narrow-gauge railway in Alabama was the Tuskegee Railroad in 1871.

Longest lived of its narrow gauges was the East Tennessee and Western North Carolina Railroad. Originally built as a broad gauge   in 1866, the line was later converted to a narrow-gauge railroad between Johnson City, Tennessee; Cranberry, North Carolina; and ultimately Boone, North Carolina. It continued in service until 1950.

Another long-lived southern narrow gauge was the Lawndale Railway and Industrial Co.

Midwest
One of the first three narrow gauges in the U.S. – the Painesville & Youngstown – opened in Ohio in 1871, and the narrow-gauge movement reached its greatest length in the Midwest. For a brief time in the 1880s it  was possible to travel by narrow gauge from Lake Erie across the Mississippi River and into Texas. The hub of this system, Delphos, Ohio, shared with Durango, Colorado the distinction of being the only towns in the United States from which it was possible to travel by narrow gauge in all four compass directions.

This common carrier railroad used electric traction, interchanged freight with all of the railroads serving Chicago, and offered direct connections to many loop businesses from 1906 to 1959.

Ohio was a center of the narrow-gauge movement. In addition to serving as the northern end of the Little Giant "transcontinental", it had several other notable lines, including the long-lived Ohio River & Western Railroad, the Kelley Island Lime & Transport Company (the world's largest operator of Shay locomotives, virtually all of them narrow gauge) and the Connotton Valley Railroad, a successful coal hauler still in operation today as the standard-gauge Wheeling & Lake Erie Railroad.  Narrow gauge railroad mileage in Ohio reached its peak in 1883 and declined rapidly after 1884.

Numerous  gauge common-carrier narrow-gauge lines were built in Iowa in the 19th century.  The largest cluster of lines radiated from Des Moines, with the Des Moines, Osceola and Southern extending south to Cainsville, Missouri, the Des Moines North-Western extending northwest to Fonda and smaller lines extending north to Boone and Ames.  These lines were all abandoned or regauged by 1900.  The Burlington and Western and the Burlington and Northwestern system extended from Burlington to Washington, Iowa and the coal fields around Oskaloosa.  This system was widened to standard gauge on June 29, 1902 and merged with the Chicago, Burlington and Quincy Railroad a year later.  The Bellevue and Cascade, from Bellevue on the Mississippi to Cascade inland remained in service until abandonment in 1936.  A caboose from the Bellevue and Cascade is the only surviving piece of Iowa narrow-gauge equipment.  It currently operates on the Midwest Central Railroad in Mount Pleasant, a heritage railroad.

In 1882, thirty-two narrow-gauge logging railroads were constructed in Michigan, and by 1889 there were eighty-nine such logging railroads in operation, totaling almost  of track.

Mountain West

The Denver and Rio Grande Railroad, opened in 1871, was one of the first three narrow gauges in the United States and by far the longest and most significant. It effectively circled the state of Colorado, and feeder lines were run to the mining communities of Leadville, Aspen, Cripple Creek, Telluride and Silverton. Through affiliated companies, its lines extended west to Salt Lake City, Utah and south to Santa Fe, New Mexico. The northern trunk line was re-gauged early to standard, but the southern portions remained steam-hauled and narrow gauge until the 1960s.

Other major narrow-gauge railroads in Colorado included the Rio Grande Southern, the Denver, South Park and Pacific, the Colorado Central, and the Florence and Cripple Creek. The Uintah Railway operated in Utah and Colorado, and boasted the tightest curve (Moro Castle curve) on a US common carrier at Baxter Pass. 

In Utah, narrow-gauge railroads sprang up immediately after the completion of the Transcontinental Railroad on May 10, 1869. The Utah and Northern Railway connected the fertile Mormon Corridor with the mining camps near Butte, Montana with an extensive three-foot gauge system that lasted from 1871 until 1887. Other narrow-gauge lines in Utah included the Wasatch & Jordan Valley (which hauled granite for the construction of the Salt Lake City Church of Jesus Christ of Latter Day Saint's temple) and the Utah & Pleasant Valley which tapped into the Pleasant Valley coal fields in north-central Utah. Both of these latter railroads eventually formed part of the Denver & Rio Grande Western System.

West Coast

The Southern Pacific operated several  gauge railroads, including the Carson and Colorado Railway and the Nevada–California–Oregon Railway, running from Reno into southern Oregon. California's independent  lines included the Pacific Coast Railway serving the Santa Maria Valley, the North Pacific Coast Railroad and South Pacific Coast Railroads extending northward and southward from San Francisco Bay, and the surviving Disneyland Railroad.

The defunct Arcata and Mad River Railroad was  gauge

Two small regional railways in the Pacific Northwest were the Ilwaco Railway and Navigation Co near Astoria, and the Sumpter Valley Railway near Baker City, Oregon. The latter still operates in the summer.

The San Francisco cable car system is  gauge as was the now defunct Los Angeles Railway and the San Diego Electric Railway.

Alaska
Alaska is home to two surviving narrow gauge railroads. 
The last surviving commercial common carrier narrow-gauge railroad in the United States was the White Pass and Yukon Route connecting Skagway, Alaska and Whitehorse, Yukon Territory. It ended common carrier service in 1982, but has since been partially reopened as a tourist railway.

The Second is in the interior of Alaska, in Fairbanks. A narrow gauge railroad known as the Tanana Valley Railroad, was bought by the Alaska Railroad in 1930, when the transition of narrow gauge to standard gauge happened. Today, the Tanana Valley Railroad steam locomotive Engine No. 1 is still operated by the Friends of the Tanana Valley Railroad and housed in the Tanana Valley Railroad Museum which is open year-round. The steam locomotive is taken out and fired up during the summer on a scheduled basis.

Hawaii
Hawaii boasted an extensive network of not only narrow-gauge sugar-cane railways, but common carriers such as the Hawaii Consolidated Railway (which was standard gauge), Ahukini Terminal & Railway Company, Koolau Railway company, Kahului Railroad, and the Oahu Railway and Land Company. The Oahu Railway and Land Company was the largest narrow-gauge class-one common-carrier railway in the US (at the time of its dissolution in 1947), and the only US narrow-gauge railroad to use signals. The section of track from Honolulu to Waipahu saw upwards of eighty trains a day, making it not only one of the busiest narrow-gauge main lines in the U.S, but one of the busiest mainlines in the world.

Other applications of narrow gauge in the U.S.
There were also numerous narrow-gauge logging railroads in Pennsylvania and West Virginia who operated mostly with geared locomotives such as Shays, Climaxes, and Heislers.

Many narrow-gauge lines were private carriers serving particular industries. One major industry that made extensive use of  gauge railroads was the logging industry, especially in the West. Although most of these lines closed by the 1950s, one notable later survivor was West Side Lumber Company railway which continued using  gauge geared steam locomotives until 1968.

There is one narrow-gauge industrial railroad still in commercial operation in the United States, the US Gypsum operation in Plaster City, California, which uses a number of Montreal Locomotive Works locomotives obtained from the White Pass after its 1982 closure. Temporary narrow-gauge railways are commonly built to support large tunneling and mining operations.

Rail haulage has been very important in the mining industry.

U.S. common-carrier narrow gauges in the twentieth century

Thousands of narrow-gauge railroads were built or projected in the U.S. The following list includes those common-carrier narrow-gauge railroads which operated into the twentieth century. Note: this list intentionally excludes tourist railroads, amusement parks, loggers, and other non-common carriers.

Narrow-gauge railroad displays
Some cars and trains from the Maine two-footers are now on display at the Maine Narrow Gauge Railroad Museum in Portland, Maine.

In 1957, the East Tennessee and Western North Carolina Railroad was revived as a tourist attraction under the common name, Tweetsie Railroad. It currently runs a three-mile (5 km) route near Blowing Rock, North Carolina. Similarly, the East Broad Top Railroad was revived in 1960 and runs on three miles of original 1873 trackage.

Significant remnants of the Colorado system remain as tourist attractions which run in the summer, including the Cumbres and Toltec Scenic Railroad running between Antonito, CO in the San Luis Valley and Chama, NM, and the Durango and Silverton Narrow Gauge Railroad running between its namesake towns of Durango and Silverton in the San Juan Mountains. Another line is the Georgetown Loop Railroad between Georgetown, Colorado and Silver Plume, Colorado in central Colorado. Much equipment from the Colorado narrow gauges is on display at the Colorado Railroad Museum in Golden, Colorado. Many pieces of the D&RGW's narrow-gauge equipment were sold off to various other companies upon its abandonment; the Ghost Town & Calico Railroad, a heritage railroad at Knott's Berry Farm in California, operates passenger service daily with two Class C-19 Consolidation (2-8-0) locomotives hauling preserved coaches along with a famed Galloping Goose RGS #3. D&RGW 223, a C-16 steam locomotive, is undergoing restoration at the Utah State Railroad Museum in Ogden, Utah.

Much of the equipment from the Westside Lumber Co. found its way to tourist lines, including the Roaring Camp & Big Trees Narrow Gauge Railroad and Yosemite Mountain Sugar Pine Railroad in California and the Midwest Central Railroad in Iowa. Additional equipment from the west coast narrow gauges is displayed at the Nevada County Narrow Gauge RR Museum, in Nevada City, CA, Laws Depot Museum, and at the Grizzly Flats Railroad (donated to Southern California Railway Museum after Ward Kimball's death) along with a Westside Lumber caboose.

The Huckleberry Railroad in Flint, Michigan began operating in 1976 using a part of an old Flint & Pere Marquette Railroad branch line. The Flint & Pere Marquette Railroad extended the branch line from Flint to Otter Lake in the late 1800s. It later came to be known as the Otter Lake Branch. Eventually the track was extended by another 4.5 miles from Otter Lake to Fostoria, for a total of 19.5 miles from Flint to Fostoria.
The Pere Marquette Railway abandoned the Flint to Fostoria branch line in 1932. The Huckleberry Railroad began operations in 1976 on the remaining section of the Flint to Fostoria line when the Genesee County Parks and Recreation Commission purchased the line and opened Crossroads Village & Huckleberry Railroad as a historical tourist attraction.

Meanwhile, in Hawaii, the Hawaiian Railway Society on the island of Oahu operates on 6 miles of remaining Oahu Railway and Land Company trackage, from the yard in Ewa to Nanakuli. More tracks remain past a burned down bridge, and past the society in Ewa,  totaling to 12 miles of remaining OR&L Right of way. On Maui, the Lahaina, Kaanapali and Pacific Railroad operates on 6 miles of tracks through former sugar plantation land. This railroad, also known as the "Sugar Cane Train" is the only 3 foot railroad in Hawaii to operate steam locomotives. On Kauai, two narrow-gauge railroads still operate. The 3 foot railroad, the Kauai Plantation Railway operates on a 3-mile loop through the Kilohana Estate and Plantation. The second narrow-gauge railroad on Kauai is a 30-inch railway, the Grove Farm Sugar Plantation Museum. They operate many different locomotives, from steam to diesel, on a mile loop through parts of the former Lihue Plantation.

See also

British narrow gauge railways
List of narrow gauge railways in Ireland

Notes

References
 
 
 
 
 
 

 
United States, narrow